Hoplitis tuberculata, also known as the Lundwood bee, is a species of bee within the family Megachilidae.

Distribution 
Hoplitis tuberculata is a subalpine species, which has an extensive distribution in mountainous habitats including the Alps mountain range. The species has been recorded in various European countries including: Austria, France, Italy, Norway, Sweden and Switzerland.

Parasites 
Hoplitis tuberculalata is known to be a host species for the following brood parasites:

 Chrysura hirsuta
 Stelis ornatula

References 

Taxa named by William Nylander (botanist)
Insects described in 1848
Megachilidae
Hymenoptera of Europe